Agaropectin is one of the two main components of agar and mainly consists of D-glucuronic acid and pyruvic acid.

Structure

Agaropectin is a sulphated galactan mixture which composes agar by 30% composition. It is the component of agar that is not agarose and is composed of varying percentages of ester sulfates, D-glucuronic acid and small amounts of pyruvic acid. Pyruvic acid is possibly attached in an acetal form to the D-galactose residues of the agarobiose skeleton. The sulfate content of the agar depends on the source of the raw material from which it is derived. Acetylation of agaropectin yields the chloroform-insoluble agaropectin acetate, as opposed to agarose acetate. This process can be used to separate the two polysaccharides via fractionation.

Use
Agaropectin has no commercial value and is discarded during the commercial processing of agar, and food grade agar is mainly composed of agarose with a molecular weight of about 120 kDa.

References

Polysaccharides